Sasakura (written: 笹倉) is a Japanese surname. Notable people with the surname include:

, Japanese manga artist
, Japanese rugby union player

Fictional characters
, protagonist of the manga series Bartender
, a character in the anime film The Sky Crawlers
, a character in the manga series School Rumble

Japanese-language surnames